One of Us is a British drama television miniseries created and written by Harry and Jack Williams for the BBC. It was released internationally in 2016 on Netflix, but was removed in January 2022. Originally titled Retribution, the series received the highest number of nominations for any television production at the 2017 Scottish Royal Television Society Awards, and actress Juliet Stevenson received a Scottish BAFTA nomination for her work on the show.

Plot
The story starts with childhood sweethearts Adam Elliot and Grace Douglas, who have married and are found brutally murdered after having returned home from their honeymoon. Their families and neighbours in the remote Scottish Highland village of Braeston are devastated. Events take an even darker turn when a badly injured man arrives at their doorstep after his car goes off the road – a man who seems to be the killer.

Cast

 Juliet Stevenson as Louise Elliot
 Joanna Vanderham as Claire Elliot 
 Laura Fraser as DI Juliet Wallace 
 Joe Dempsie as Rob Elliot 
 John Lynch as Bill Douglas 
 Georgina Campbell as Anna 
 Julie Graham as Moira Douglas
 Cristian Ortega as Jamie Douglas
 Louie O'Raw as (5-year-old) Adam Elliot
 Maisie O'Raw as (5-year-old) Grace Douglas
 Jeremy Neumark Jones as (adult) Adam Elliot
 Kate Bracken as (adult) Grace Douglas
 Owen Whitelaw as Lee Walsh
 Steve Evets as  DS Andrew Barker
 Gary Lewis as  Alastair 
 Adrian Edmondson as Peter Elliot 
 Kate Dickie as Sal
 Kae Alexander as Yuki
 Stuart Dutton (Police Sergeant)

Episode list

Reception
Critical reception of the first episode was positive, with Joni Blyth of The Evening Standard describing it as "Tarantino-meets-Shakespeare. . . . A mash-up of Romeo and Juliet and The Hateful Eight, with the plight of young lovers bringing conflict between two families, who are trapped together with a killer during a storm. Whether it ends in Tarantino-like carnage remains to be seen". Ben Dowell of the Radio Times praised the opening episode as "a clever, chilling and original thriller" and "a strong opener to what promises to be a gripping four-part series". Dowell praised the acting as "first rate, even if a lot of the acting requires rather a lot of frenetic emoting as this horror story unfolds". The series also was praised for its tone and style, with Phill Fisk of The Guardian calling it "a grim, gloomy thriller with a latent moral edge".

References

External links
 

2016 British television series debuts
2016 British television series endings
2010s British drama television series
BBC television dramas
BBC high definition shows
British crime drama television series
2010s British television miniseries
English-language television shows
Television shows set in Scotland